Great Sounds Great, Good Sounds Good, So-so Sounds So-so, Bad Sounds Bad, Rotten Sounds Rotten (usually simply known as Great Sounds Great) is the second EP by The Clean, a lo-fi rock band from Dunedin, New Zealand. It was released by Flying Nun Records on 12" vinyl in 1982.  

The EP is included in its entirety, and in the same running order, as part of The Clean's 2002 CD release Anthology.

Track listing

Charts

References

External links

The Clean albums
1982 EPs
Flying Nun Records EPs
Albums produced by Chris Knox